North China, or Huabei is a geographical region of China, consisting of the provinces of Beijing, Tianjin, Hebei, Shanxi and Inner Mongolia. Part of the larger region of Northern China (Beifang), it lies north of the Qinling–Huaihe Line, with its heartland in the North China Plain.

In modern times, the area has shifted in terms of socio-political and economic composition. Nowadays unique, embracing a North Chinese culture, it is influenced by Marxism, Soviet systems of industry while preserving a traditional Chinese indigenous culture. Agriculturally, the region cultivates wheat.

Most inhabitants here speak variants of Northern Chinese languages such as Mandarin, which includes Beijing dialect and its cousin variants. The Beijing dialect is largely the basis of Standard Chinese (or Standard Mandarin), the official language of the People's Republic of China (PRC). Jin Chinese and Mongolian are also widely spoken due to the political and cultural history of the area.

History

In prehistory, the region was home to the Yangshao and Longshan cultures. Peking man was found near modern-day Beijing.

The main agricultural lands of China lay in the area known as the Central Plain, an area located bordered by the Yangtze river to its south and the Yellow River to its north. Further north of the Yellow River lies the Gobi desert and steppe lands that extend west across Eurasia. This region has long, harsh winters and suffers from water scarcity. Despite these challenges, some forms of agriculture have been successful in this region, especially animal husbandry, certainly of horse and camel, and possibly other types of animals. The crops Panicum miliaceum and Setaria italica, both types of millet grain, are believed to be indigenous to northern China.  Panicum miliaceum is known from the Cishan culture in Hebei province, recovered as phytoliths from pits in stratigraphic sections. Sediments from the pits have radiocarbon dates from 8500 to 7500 BCE. Archaeological evidence of charred grains found in early Holocene layers in Hebei province at Nanzhuangtou and Cishan has led scholars to revise the earliest dates associated with millet by about two millennia. Millet sites are concentrated along the boundaries of the Loess and Mongolian Plateau, separated by a mountain chain from the Huabei plain and the Dongbei plain, North China's main alluvial plains, located to the west. Millet cultivation was similarly situated relative to the Qinling mountains at Dadiwan, and the Yitai mountains at Yuezhuang. Macrofossil evidence (charred grains of foxtail and broomcorn millet) has been recovered from Xinglonggou in Inner Mongolia, Xinle in Liaoning, Cishan in Hebei, and Dadiwan in Gansu, among other sites in Eastern and Central China.

Administrative divisions in the PRC

Cities with urban area over one million in population 
 Provincial capitals in bold.

See also 

 Northern China
 North China Plain
 Inner Mongolia
 Northeast China
 Northwest China
 East China

References 

Regions of China